The Polish minority in Latvia numbers about 51,548 and (according to the Latvian data from 2011) forms 2.3% of the population of Latvia. Poles are concentrated in the former Inflanty Voivodeship region, with about 18,000 in Daugavpils (Dyneburg) and 17,000 in Riga. People of Polish ethnicity have lived on the territory of modern Latvia since the 16th century. In modern Latvia their citizenship status  vary:  non-citizens of Latvia, as citizens of Poland, or as citizens of Latvia.

Demography 

Mixed marriages are common for the ethnic Poles in Latvia: per cent distribution of males with spouse of different ethnicity was 89%, of females with spouse of different ethnicity was 90% (1990–2007)

Polish organizations in Latvia 

The largest Polish organization in Latvia is Association of Poles in Latvia (Związek Polaków na Łotwie).

See also

Latvia–Poland relations

References

  Polacy za granicą
  Polacy na Łotwie – history
  Polacy na Łotwie – in documents
  Związek Polaków na Łotwie

External links 
Will Mawhood (June 8, 2016). The Forgotten Minority: Latvia’s Poles Through Independence and Occupation. Deep Baltic.

Ethnic groups in Latvia
 
Latvia